Pyruz Payandeh Azad (born May 4, 1962 in Tehran) is a Persian pop singer, songwriter, guitarist, and former member of the group Black Cats.

Discography

Albums With Black Cats

 1992: Pool
 1993: Fever
 1996: Spell of the Cats

Solo Albums

 2000: New Love
 2001: Pendar-E-Neek
 2004: A Better Tomorrow
 2012: Always

External links
Pyruz's Official Website
Black Cats Official Website

1961 births
Living people
Iranian exiles
People from Tehran
Iranian pop singers
Singers from Tehran
Iranian male singers
Caltex Records artists
Taraneh Records artists
Persian-language singers
Iranian singer-songwriters
20th-century Iranian male singers
21st-century Iranian male singers
Iranian emigrants to the United States